Alan Simpson may refer to:
Alan Simpson (theatre director) (1920–1980), Irish theatre director
Alan Simpson (scriptwriter) (1929–2017), British screenwriter, of Galton and Simpson
Alan Simpson (American politician) (born 1931), former United States Senator from Wyoming
Alan Simpson (athlete) (born 1940), British runner
Alan Simpson (British politician) (born 1948), British Labour Party politician
Alan Simpson (actor) (born 1983), American actor

See also
Allan Simpson (born 1977), American baseball player
 Allan Simpson (born 1948), Canadian baseball writer and founder of Baseball America
Simpson (name)